Chapter 4: Bill of Rights.  Chapter 4 of the 1997 Constitution of Fiji is titled Bill of Rights.  It is one of the longest chapters of the Constitution, comprising a total of twenty-three sections.

Fiji's Bill of Rights covers Sections 21 through 43 of the Constitution.   Significantly, it sets out the rights of the people and the limitations on the powers of the various branches of government, before specifying the structure of the government.  The idea is that the government is subject to human rights, rather than the reverse.

Section 21 deals with the application of the Bill of rights.  It binds all members of all branches of the Fijian government — legislative, executive, or judicial — at all levels: central, divisional, and local.  Laws conflicting with the Bill of Rights are prohibited.  Clause 6 of this section goes so far as to declare, "To the extent that it is capable of doing so, this Chapter extends to things done or actions taken outside Fiji."  This implies the stand that Fiji will take on behalf of human rights in international forums such as the United Nations.

Section 22 guarantees the most fundamental right of all — the right to life.

Sections 23 to 29 set out people's basic judicial rights, and spell out the limitations on the powers of law enforcement authorities.
 Section 23 and 26 establish the right to personal liberty and the freedom from unreasonable searches and seizure.  Arbitrary arrest, and unreasonable searches of persons or property, are prohibited.
 Section 24 - freedom from servitude and forced labour.  All forms of slavery and forced labour are prohibited.  Forced labour does not include labour reasonably required of a person serving a prison term, duties required of a member of Fiji's Armed Forces, or the "labour reasonably required as part of reasonable and normal communal or civic obligations."
 Section 25 - freedom from cruel or degrading treatment.  All forms of physical, mental, and emotional torture are prohibited, as are "cruel, inhumane, degrading or disproportionately severe treatment or punishment."  Similarly, nobody may be subjected to scientific or medical treatment without informed consent, or the consent of a lawful guardian.
 Section 27 sets out the rights of arrested, detained, or charged persons.  Every person who is arrested or detained must be informed in writing, in a language they understand, of the reasons for the detention and of the nature of the charges.  No person may be detained without trial, nor detained without the right to legal representation.  Detainees who cannot afford to pay for legal services are to have legal aid provided for free.   All detainees are to be treated "to be treated with humanity and with respect for their inherent dignity."
 Section 28 deals with the rights of charged persons.  No person may be tried in absence, unless the court is satisfied that the charged person's failure to attend the trial is deliberate.  No person may be prosecuted for an offence that was not unlawful at the time it occurred, not be sentenced to a more severe punishment than was applicable when the offence occurred.  Nor may any person be tried a second time for an offense of which they have previously been convicted or acquitted.
 Section 29 guarantees the right of access to courts or tribunals, and the right to a fair trial.

Sections 30 through 39 set out personal and communal freedoms.  Except in a few limited circumstances related to national security, public safety or health, people are guaranteed freedom of expression (Section 30) assembly (including the right to protest and demonstrate — Section 31),  and association (Section 32).  Hate speech, slander, and defamation are explicitly excluded from the protection of the Freedom of Expression clause.
 Section 33 lays down the rules for labour relations.  The rights of both employers and workers to form associations and bargain collectively are protected.  Every worker has the right to be treated humanely and to work in an environment that is as safe as practicable.
 Section 34 guarantees freedom of movement.  Every citizen, and every other person lawfully resident in Fiji, has the right to reside in any part of Fiji, to move freely throughout Fiji, and to leave Fiji.  Subsequent to leaving, every citizen of Fiji has the right to return at any time.
 Section 35 establishes freedom of religion and belief.  "Every person has the right, either individually or in community with others, and both in public and in private, to manifest  religion or belief in worship, observance, practice or teaching."  No person may be required to attend any religious ceremony without their consent, or the consent of a parent or guardian if the person is under the age of 18, and "A person must not be compelled to take an oath, or to take an oath in a manner contrary to their religion or belief, or that requires them to express a belief they do not hold."  These provisions were included in the Constitution to allay the fears of Hindus and Muslims that an ethnic-Fijian (and Christian-dominated) government might compel their children to receive Christian religious instruction through the school system, as well as fears of some Christians that employers, many of whom are Indo-Fijian, might require participation in Hindu festivals.
 Section 36 provides for the secret ballot.  Every voter has the right to vote confidentially.
 Section 37 affirms the right to individual privacy.  Unless national security or public order is at stake, the privacy of personal communication is inviolable.  This rules out telephone tapping, e-mail monitoring, and mail censorship.
 Section 38 declares all persons to be equal before the law, and prohibits discrimination on the grounds of race, ethnic origin, colour, place of origin, gender, sexual orientation, birth, primary language, economic status, age, disability, religious belief, or political opinion.  In the case of disabled persons, restaurants, hotels, places of entertainment, taxis, and other public amenities must make reasonable provision for their access.
 Section 39 guarantees the right of all persons to a basic education, and to equal access to educational institutions.  Every religious denomination, and every cultural and social community, has the right to establish and manage schools.  Such schools may be administered on the basis of the need to maintain their religious, cultural, or social character, but admission must be "open to all qualified students without discrimination on any ground prohibited by this Constitution."
 Section 40 prohibits the compulsory acquisition of property by the state, except in a few very restricted circumstances related to public purposes.  In such cases, compensation to the full market value of the property must be paid.

Sections 41 through 43 deal with matters concerning the enforcement of the Bill of Rights, and its interpretation.
 Section 41 deals with the enforcement of the Bill of Rights.  The High Court is empowered to interpret the Constitution, and persons considering that any provisions of the Bill of Rights have been or are likely to be contravened, may appeal to the High Court.  Those receiving an unfavorable verdict may appeal to the Court of Appeal or to the Supreme Court (Fiji).
 Section 42 establishes the Human Rights Commission, which is empowered to educate the public about their rights under the Bill of Rights, and to make recommendations to the government about human rights issues.  The Human Rights Commission is chaired by the  Ombudsman of Fiji, one person who is qualified to be a judge, and a third person appointed by the President on the advice of the Prime Minister, who is first required to consult the Leader of the Opposition and the House of Representatives committee responsible for human rights.
 Section 43 lays out how the Bill of Rights is to be interpreted.  The Bill of Rights denies being an exhaustive document.  All rights and freedoms recognized or conferred by common law, customary law, and legislation, are deemed to be granted unless clearly inconsistent with the Bill of Rights.  In addition, in interpreting the Bill of Rights, the courts "must promote the values that underlie a democratic society based on freedom and equality and must, if relevant, have regard to public international law."

1997 Constitution of Fiji
National human rights instruments